Molvena is a town in the province of Vicenza, Veneto, Italy. It is the location of the headquarters of Diesel S.p.A. Molvena was also a comune until 2019, when it merged with the Mason Vicentino to form Colceresa.

Sport
The town's soccer team is ASD Colceresa.

Economy 
The Diesel clothing company has its headquarters in the town. It was founded by Renzo Rosso, the chairman of L.R. Vicenza. Other companies based in Molvena include Dainese, founded in 1972 and Bonotto, founded in 1902.

Sources

(Google Maps)

Cities and towns in Veneto